Alice Hanratty (born 1939) is an Irish artist who specialises in printmaking with a preference for etching.

She was born in  Dublin and studied painting and printmaking at the National College of Art and Design, Dublin, and the Hornsey College of Art, London. She spent some time working in East Africa in the late 1960s which inevitably has had influence on her work. She is a member of the Aosdána affiliation of Irish artists and of its governing body, the Toscaireacht.

As well as exhibiting work in major Irish group shows, she has represented Ireland at exhibitions such as the International Impact Exhibition, Kyoto in 1989; the Works on Paper Group Exhibition at the Armory, New York in 1992; the London Original Print Fair, Royal Academy of Arts, in 1995; the International Biennale of Print, Beograd in 1998; and the Estampe International Print Exchange, Paris, in 2001. Her work has also been included in group shows at home and abroad, including ‘The Delighted Eye’ in London (1979); ‘Irish Artists’ in Chicago (1980); ‘Irish Women Artists from the Eighteenth Century to the Present Day’ in Dublin (1987); ‘International Impact Exhibition’ in Kyoto (1989); ‘London Original Print Fair’ at the Royal Academy of Arts (1995); and the Estampe International Print Exchange’ in Paris (2001).

Works in collections
Trinity College Dublin
The Arts Council of Ireland
Arts Council of Northern Ireland

References

1939 births
Living people
Aosdána members
20th-century Irish painters
21st-century Irish painters
Artists from Dublin (city)
Irish women painters
Alumni of the National College of Art and Design
20th-century Irish women artists
21st-century Irish women artists